Thomas Francis Farrell (born January 18, 1944) represented the United States of America in two Olympic Games, in the 800 metres race.  He placed fifth in Tokyo in 1964 and won the bronze medal in Mexico City in 1968.

He attended Archbishop Molloy High School in Queens, New York. After finishing high school Farrell enrolled at St. John's University in Jamaica, New York where he was coached by Steve Bartold.  At the age of 19 Farrell placed fifth in the 800 metres race in the 1964 Tokyo Olympic Games, behind winner and world record holder Peter Snell.

In 1965 he won the United States National Championship in the 880 yard race. He won the 1968 United States Olympic Trials (track and field) at 800 meters.

He competed for the United States in the 1968 Summer Olympics held in Mexico City in the 800 metres where he won the bronze medal.

Farrell lives in Southern California with his wife, Chris.  He's still involved in athletics as a volunteer track coach at St. John's University, New York.

References

 

1944 births
Living people
American male middle-distance runners
Olympic bronze medalists for the United States in track and field
Athletes (track and field) at the 1964 Summer Olympics
Athletes (track and field) at the 1968 Summer Olympics
Archbishop Molloy High School alumni
Medalists at the 1968 Summer Olympics
Track and field athletes from New York City